Mweiga is a small town in Nyeri County, Kenya.

References 

Populated places in Central Province (Kenya)
Nyeri County